Lev Aleksandrovich Danilkin (born 1 December 1974) is a Russian writer and literary critic. He won the Big Book literary prize in 2017.

Education 
Lev Danilkin was born into a family of literary teachers. He studied in middle schools in Odintsovo, Moscow Oblast, and in Moscow and graduated n 1998 from graduate school of philology of the Moscow State University.

Career 
In 1999–2000, Danilkin worked as the chief editor of the Russian edition of Playboy magazine. For 15 years he led the column Books with Lev Danilkin in Afisha magazine.

By the time he departed from Afisha in 2014, Danilkin had already written several biographies, including Man With an Egg: The Life and Views of Alexander Prokhanov about controversial writer Alexander Prokhanov, a book that was a finalist for the 2008 National Bestseller and Big Book awards. He also wrote a life of cosmonaut Yuri Gagarin for the ZhZL series.

Danilkin's greatest subject is Lenin, and his 2017 book Lenin. Pantocrator of Dust Motes became one of the central literary events surrounding the centenary of the October Revolution in Russia. That year it won both the Big Book and Book of the Year awards.

By peers and colleagues, Danilkin is praised as 'the leading critic in Russia'. Some consider him more talented than people he writes about.

In 2021, Danilkin was honoured with award „Свети Стефан Штиљановић“ at serbian festival „Ћирилица“.

References

External links 
 Lev Danilkin's articles on Afisha magazine site

Moscow State University alumni
Russian literary critics
Russian biographers
21st-century Russian writers
21st-century Russian journalists
1974 births
Living people